Operation Doppelschlag ("Double Blow") was a plan for a sortie in 1942 during the Second World War into the Arctic Ocean by the . The operation followed Operation Rösselsprung, against Convoy PQ 17 in July 1942 to attack convoy PQ 18 the next Arctic convoy of the Western Allies.

Background 
To this end they planned a similar evolution in order to bring a strong force of capital ships and destroyers against the next supply convoy to destroy it. The commanders of the surface forces were disappointed they had been unable to take a more active part in the attack on PQ 17 and were determined to do better next time.

The Allies wished to avoid running another convoy in the continuous daylight of the Arctic summer and deferred passage of PQ 18 until later in the year. Thus the German forces spent over two months at readiness before PQ 18 sailed in early September 1942.

Planning 
In its early stage  resembled  in that the forces involved would wait in readiness at their bases until a convoy was detected, whilst a patrol line of U-boats (code-named "Ice Palace") was stationed in the Norwegian Sea to give early warning of any convoys approach.

Once the convoy was detected the ships would sail north to Altafjord, to await the order to sortie and attack. The extreme sensitivity to the possibility of losing a capital ship in an engagement with the Allied fleet meant that only Hitler could give permission for the second stage, the sortie into the Barents Sea. Once out the ships would divide into two battle groups, to attack the convoy from different sides. It was envisaged that the first group would engage and draw off any heavy units with the convoy, while the second would attack the merchant ships without serious opposition. It was this intended "double blow" that inspired the operational name.

Operation
PQ 18 sailed from Iceland on 7 September 1942. It was sighted on 8 September by a long-range aircraft, and again on 10 September by an "Ice Palace" U-boat. On 10 September, the ships of operation  left harbour at Narvik to move north to Altenfjord. In this they were sighted by patrolling British submarines and one, Tigris mounted an attack, though without success. The ships arrived at Altenfjord early the following day.

From this point the  commanders, Vice-Admiral Oskar Kummetz in Scheer, and Vice Admiral Otto Ciliax ashore, pressed for permission to sortie but Hitler's insistence that no damage should befall the ships so restricted their freedom of action that Admiral Erich Raeder, the Navy's supreme commander, cancelled the operation.

Aftermath 
The German surface fleet had little effect on the passage of PQ 18, though the potential threat it posed had forced a heavy commitment of Allied vessels as escort. This would result in the Battle of the Barents Sea.

Footnotes

Bibliography 
 Clay Blair. (1996). Hitler's U-Boat War Vol I. 
 Paul Kemp. (1993). Convoy! Drama in Arctic Waters. 
 Bernard Schofield. (1964). The Russian Convoys. ISBN (none)
 Peter Smith. (1975). Arctic Victory: The Story of Convoy PQ 18. 

Arctic naval operations of World War II
Arctic convoys of World War II